Margaret Joan Cox (6 August 1914 – July 2004) was an English track and field athlete who won the bronze medal in the javelin throw at the 1934 British Empire Games, forming part of an English medal sweep with Gladys Lunn and Edith Halstead.

She was the winner of the javelin at the 1933 International University Games – the only non-Italian woman to win at the competition.

References

1914 births
2004 deaths
British female javelin throwers
English female javelin throwers
Commonwealth Games bronze medallists for England
Commonwealth Games medallists in athletics
Athletes (track and field) at the 1934 British Empire Games
Medallists at the 1934 British Empire Games